Weldborough is a rural locality in the local government areas of Break O'Day and Dorset in the North-east region of Tasmania. The 2016 census determined a population of 28 for the state suburb of Weldborough.

History
The area was named for Sir Frederick Weld, Governor of Tasmania from 1875 to 1880. Weldborough was gazetted as a locality in 1969.

Geography
The North George River forms part of the southern boundary.

Road infrastructure
The Tasman Highway (A3) enters from the north-west and runs south-east through the village before exiting to the south-east. Route C425 (Blundell Street / Mount Paris Dam Road) starts at an intersection with A3  and runs west and south-west before exiting.

References

Localities of Break O'Day Council
Localities of Dorset Council (Australia)
Towns in Tasmania